Armstrong River may refer to:

 Armstrong River (Manitoba)
 Armstrong River (Minnesota)
 A tributary of the Victoria River in Northern Territory, Australia